An urban area in the Nordic countries, with the exception of Iceland, is defined as a distinct statistical concept used to differentiate population clusters independent of municipal borders. The population is measured on a national level, independently by each country's statistical bureau.

A uniform statistical definition between the Nordic countries was agreed upon in 1960, which defines an urban area as a continuous built-up area whose population is at least 200 inhabitants and where the maximum distance between residences is 200 metres; discounting roads, parking spaces, parks, sports grounds and cemeteries – without regard to the ward, municipal or county boundaries. Despite the uniform definition, the various statistical bureaus have different approaches in conducting these measurements, resulting in slight variation between the different countries.

Despite belonging to the Nordic countries, Iceland does not follow the same definition of "urban area" for statistical purposes. The Nordic definition is unique to the four other countries, and should not be confused with the international concepts of metropolitan area or urban areas in general.

Urban areas in Sweden

In Sweden, urban areas are measured by the national statistical institution Statistics Sweden. They utilize the native language term  in Swedish and "" in English. There are a total 1,979 localities in Sweden, with the largest being the Stockholm urban area at approximately 1,580,000 inhabitants in 2017. Roughly 87% of the Swedish population lives within localities.

Statistics Sweden also utilizes  "" to refer to a rural locality with 50–199 inhabitants in a contiguous built-up area with no more than 150 meters between houses. The concept is rarely used outside the field of statistics, where it is used for settlements just below the limit defined for tätort.

Urban areas in Denmark

Urban areas in Finland

In Finland, urban areas are measured by the national statistical institution Statistics Finland. The largest urban area in Finland is the Helsingin keskustaajama ("Helsinki central urban area") with approximately 1,270,000 inhabitants in 2017. It extends across Helsinki as well as 10 other municipalities in the Greater Helsinki area. The second largest is the Tampereen keskustaajama with approximately 330,000 inhabitants in 2017.

The rough presence of urban areas is used to regulate traffic, with a default of  speed limit inside a taajama and  outside. Most major roads leading in or out of an urban area are marked with a road sign.

Urban areas in Norway

Despite adhering to the same definition of an urban area as the rest of the Nordics, Norway utilizes an automated demarcation system, in use since 1999. The demarcation system has been updated on a few occasions, most recently in 2013. In 2013, there were a total of 963 differentiated urban areas in the country. The largest of these is the urban area surrounding Oslo, with a population of approximately 1 million.

See also
 List of urban areas in the Nordic countries

Notes

References

External links
 Tätorter on Statistics Sweden
 Taajama on Statistics Finland
 Byområde on Statistics Denmark
 Tettsted on Statistics Norway

Cities and towns in Denmark
Cities and towns in Finland
Cities and towns in Norway
Populated places in Sweden